Ephestia elutella, the cacao moth, tobacco moth or warehouse moth, is a small moth of the family Pyralidae. It is probably native to Europe, but has been transported widely, even to Australia. A subspecies is E. e. pterogrisella.

The wingspan is 14–20 mm. This moth flies throughout the warmer months, e.g. from the end of April to October in Belgium and the Netherlands.

Infestation

The caterpillars of Ephestia elutella are often considered a pest, as they feed on dry plant produce, such as cocoa beans and tobacco, as well as cereals and dried fruit and nuts. Less usual foods include dried-out meat and animal carcasses, specimens in insect collections, and dry wood.

Tobacco and its related products can be infested by Lasioderma serricorne (tobacco beetle) and Ephestia elutella, which are the most widespread and damaging parasites to the tobacco industry. Infestation can range from the tobacco cultivated in the fields to the leaves used for manufacturing cigars, cigarillos, cigarettes, etc.

Taxonomy
This species has been known under a number of junior synonyms:
 Ephestia amarella Dyar, 1904
 Ephestia icosiella Ragonot, 1888
 Ephestia infumatella Ragonot, 1887
 Ephestia roxburghi (lapsus)
 Ephestia roxburghii Gregson, 1873
 Ephestia roxburgii (lapsus)
 Ephestia uniformata Dufrane, 1942 (variety)
 Homoeosoma affusella Ragonot, 1888
 Hyphantidium sericarium Scott, 1859
 Phycis angusta (Haworth, 1811)
 Phycis elutea Haworth, 1811; (unjustified emendation)
 Phycis rufa Haworth, 1811
 Phycis semirufa Haworth, 1811
 Tinea elutella Hübner, 1796

Footnotes

References

External links

Lepidoptera of Belgium
Cacao moth on UKMoths

Phycitini
Household pest insects
Moths described in 1796
Invertebrates of the Arabian Peninsula
Moths of Japan
Moths of Europe
Moths of New Zealand
Insects of Turkey
Insects of Iceland